Norman Ashe (born 16 November 1943) is an English former footballer who played in the Football League for Aston Villa and Rotherham United.

References

English footballers
English Football League players
1943 births
Living people
Aston Villa F.C. players
Rotherham United F.C. players
Nuneaton Borough F.C. players
Falmouth Town A.F.C. players
Porthleven F.C. players
Truro City F.C. players
Sportspeople from Walsall
Association football wingers